Newport Cup may refer to:

Newport Cup (golf), a golf tournament on the Champions Tour from 1987 to 1992 held at the Newport Country Club
Newport Cup (polo), an alternative name for the International Polo Cup
Newport Cup (yachting), New York Harbor race